Barket Bekrar (born 17 February 1975 in Martigues, France) is a French-Algerian former professional footballer who played as a midfielder. He played for FC Martigues in the French third tier and 46 games in Ligue 2 from 2000 to 2002.

References

Living people
1975 births
People from Martigues
Sportspeople from Bouches-du-Rhône
Association football midfielders
Algerian footballers
French footballers
Ligue 2 players
FC Martigues players
French sportspeople of Algerian descent
Footballers from Provence-Alpes-Côte d'Azur